The Doldenhorn is a mountain of the Bernese Alps, overlooking Kandersteg in the Bernese Oberland. On its north side is Lake Oeschinen.

See also
List of mountains of Switzerland

References

External links

Doldenhorn on Hikr

Bernese Alps
Mountains of the Alps
Alpine three-thousanders
Mountains of Switzerland
Mountains of the canton of Bern